Beshkent is a city in Qarshi District of Qashqadaryo Region in Uzbekistan. It is the capital of Qarshi District. The town population was 11551 people in 1989, and 18,900 in 2016.

References

Populated places in Qashqadaryo Region
Cities in Uzbekistan